The 2011 Corby Borough Council election took place on 5 May 2011 to elect members of Corby Borough Council in England. This was on the same day as other UK local elections. The Labour Party retained control of the council, which it had held continuously since 1979.

Ward-by-Ward Results

Beanfield Ward (2 seats)

Central Ward (1 seat)

Danesholme Ward (2 seats)

East Ward (3 seats)

Exeter Ward (1 seat)

Great Oakley (1 seat)

Kingswood Ward (3 seats)

Lodge Park (2 seats)

Oakley Vale Ward (3 seats)

Rowlett Ward (2 seats)

Rural West Ward (1 seat)

Shire Lodge (2 seats)

Stanion and Corby Village Ward (2 seats)

Tower Hill Ward (2 seats)

Weldon and Gretton Ward (2 seats)

References

2011 English local elections
May 2011 events in the United Kingdom
2015
2010s in Northamptonshire